Calonotos dorata is a moth of the subfamily Arctiinae. It was described by Paul Dognin in 1897. It is found in Ecuador, Colombia and Bolivia.

References

Arctiinae
Moths described in 1897